Kalmiopsis Wilderness is a wilderness area in the Klamath Mountains of southwestern Oregon, within the Rogue River – Siskiyou National Forest.

The Kalmiopsis Wilderness was named for Kalmiopsis leachiana, a slow-growing plant related to the rhododendron, which was discovered in the area in 1930.

History
Historically, the Kalmiopsis Wilderness was a mining district. Gold was discovered about 1850, causing a gold rush into the area. A number of mining towns were built and more than a dozen hard rock mines were started. Many people lived there up into the mid-1940s. In 1962, many of the homes and stores were still habitable and all the mining equipment and buildings were still in place.

The wilderness area was established in 1964. In 2002, lightning started the Biscuit Fire that burned much of the area and damaged many of the hiking trails. Some of the trails destroyed in the fire re-opened in 2015.

Topography
The area is characterized by deep, rough canyons, sharp rock ridges, and clear, rushing mountain streams and rivers. The wilderness includes the headwater basins of the Chetco, North Fork Smith Rivers, as well as part of the Illinois River canyon. All three of these rivers have been designated Wild and Scenic.

Geology

The Kalmiopsis Wilderness is part of the Klamath Mountain geologic province of northwestern California and southwestern Oregon. The eastern half is part of the Josephine "ultramafic" sheet, meaning it has a very high iron and magnesium content.  The western half of the Wilderness is underlain by the sedimentary rocks of the Dothan formation and by the igneous intrusive rocks of the Big Craggies.  Most of the rocks in this province were formerly parts of the oceanic crust, and include serpentine, submarine volcanic flow rocks, intrusive granite-like rocks, and sedimentary rocks such as shale and sandstone.  Historic mine sites for gold and chromite can still be found in the form of cabin sites, mines, and ditches.

Vegetation

Diversity of topography and geology provide excellent habitat for a wide variety of botanical species.  The Kalmiopsis leachiana plant was discovered in 1930 by Lilla Leach in the Gold Basin area.  The plant is a relict of the pre-ice age and the oldest member of the Ericaceae Family, and is the namesake of the Kalmiopsis Wilderness.  In 2002, the nearly  Biscuit Fire burned the entire wilderness area.  The environment has changed dramatically and provides a unique opportunity to observe a natural response to fire disturbance through plant succession, erosional and depositional occurrences and changed habitat for flora and fauna. The Chetco Bar Fire re-burned large portions of the area in 2017.

See also 
 List of Oregon Wildernesses
 List of U.S. Wilderness Areas
 Wilderness Act

References

External links 

 Summary of Biscuit Complex Fire - Wilderness Society
 National Public Radio - Audio story after the Biscuit Fire.
  - Kalmiopsis leachiana Survival in a land of Extremes

Wilderness areas of Oregon
Rogue River-Siskiyou National Forest
Klamath Mountains
Protected areas of Curry County, Oregon
Protected areas of Josephine County, Oregon
Rogue River (Oregon)
IUCN Category Ib
Protected areas established in 1964
1964 establishments in Oregon